DIN or Din or din may refer to:

People and language
 Din (name), people with the name
 Dīn, an Arabic word with three general senses: judgment, custom, and religion from which the name originates
 Dinka language (ISO 639 code: din), spoken by the major ethnic group of South Sudan

Places
 Dīn or Lavardin, Iran

Media and entertainment
 Din, a goddess in The Legend of Zelda series of video games
 Din, a member of the Harvard Din & Tonics
 "Din", a song by Therion from the album Sitra Ahra (album)
 DIN, a music project founded by Ontario-based composer Jean-Claude Cutz
 Din (EP), by Oscar Zia
 Din (din is noise), a free software musical instrument & audio synthesizer
 din_fiv, a music project by San Francisco-based composer David Din (Da5id Din)
 Din News, Pakistani 24-hour news channel
 Dins, a 2006 studio album by Psychic Ills
 Din: The Day a 2022 Bangladeshi film

Organizations
 Deutsches Institut für Normung (DIN), German Institute for Standardization
 List of DIN standards

 DIN connector, a set of electrical connector standards
 DIN film speed, a former film speed standard
 DIN paper size, a paper size standard
 Nakam, also known as Din (judgement), a Jewish group that attempted to get revenge for the Holocaust

Other uses
 Director Identification Number, an 8-digit unique ID for Indian company directors.
 Drug identification number, a unique number given to all drugs sold in Canada
 Gevurah (Kabbalah) or Din, one of the ten aspects of the Ein Sof in Kabbalah
 din, currency symbol for the Serbian dinar
 DIN, vehicle registration for the German town of Dinslaken